The following are notable or famous people who were all born in, residents of, or otherwise closely associated with Youngstown, Ohio. Youngstown is a city in the U.S. state of Ohio and the county seat of Mahoning County. Youngstown has its own metropolitan area, but the Pittsburgh Tri-State and Greater Cleveland influence the region.

The city was named for John Young, an early settler from Whitestown, New York, who established the community's first sawmill and gristmill. Youngstown is located in a region of the United States that is often referred to as the Rust Belt. Traditionally known as a center of steel production, Youngstown was forced to redefine itself when the U.S. steel industry fell into decline in the 1970s, leaving communities throughout the region without major industry. The 2010 census showed that Youngstown had a total population of 66,982, making it Ohio's ninth largest city. A U.S. Census Bureau estimate released in July 2019 placed the population at 65,469.

Arts and entertainment

Musical groups

Business

Education

Military

Politics

Religion

Science

Sports

References

 
Lists of people by city in the United States
Lists of people from Ohio